The Unbong Dam, or Yunfeng Dam, is a concrete gravity dam on the Yalu River which borders China and North Korea. The primary purpose of the dam is hydroelectric power generation and it supports a 400 MW power station. Construction of the dam had initially began in August 1942 but was halted in 1945 after the surrender of Japan ending World War II. In October 1959, construction on the dam recommenced and in September 1965, the first of the four 100 MW Francis turbine-generators was operational. The last generator was operational on 4 April 1967. The dam is located before a bend in the river and its power station is located on the other side of a ridge that meets the dam's right abutment. Generators 1 and 3 deliver power to China while 2 and 4 deliver to North Korea.

See also

List of dams and reservoirs in China
List of major power stations in Jilin

References

Dams in China
Hydroelectric power stations in Jilin
Gravity dams
Dams in North Korea
Hydroelectric power stations in North Korea
China–North Korea relations
Dams completed in 1965
Dams on the Yalu River
1965 establishments in China
1965 establishments in North Korea
Buildings and structures in Chagang Province
20th-century architecture in North Korea